Spoegrivier is a town in Namakwa District Municipality in the Northern Cape province of South Africa.

Town some 13 km west-north-west of Karkams and 46 km east of Hondeklipbaai. It takes its name from the non-perennial stream which rises north of it and extends south and then west to enter the Atlantic Ocean 20 km south-east of Hondeklipbaai. Afrikaans for ‘spit river’, the name is probably translated from Khoekhoen Kanoep, referring to a disease affecting cattle.

References

Populated places in the Kamiesberg Local Municipality